Angus Stanley King Jr. (born March 31, 1944) is an American lawyer and politician serving as the junior United States senator from Maine since 2013. A political independent since 1993, he previously served as the 72nd governor of Maine from 1995 to 2003.

King won Maine's 2012 Senate election to replace the retiring Republican Olympia Snowe and took office on January 3, 2013. He was reelected to a second term in 2018, following the state's inaugural instant-runoff voting elections. For committee assignment purposes, he caucuses with the Democratic Party. He is one of three independents currently serving in the Senate; the other two are Bernie Sanders of Vermont and Kyrsten Sinema of Arizona, who also caucus with the Democrats.

Early life, education, and early career
King was born in Alexandria, Virginia, the son of Ellen Archer (née Ticer) and Angus Stanley King, a lawyer. His father was a U.S. magistrate for the Eastern District of Virginia.

He attended Dartmouth College, earning his B.A. in 1966. While a student at Dartmouth, King joined the Delta Upsilon social fraternity. He then attended the University of Virginia School of Law, graduating in 1969.

Soon after graduating from law school, King entered private law practice in Brunswick, Maine. He was a staff attorney for Pine Tree Legal Assistance in Skowhegan.

In 1972, he served as chief counsel to the U.S. Senate Subcommittee on Alcoholism and Narcotics. King served as a legislative assistant to Democratic U.S. Senator William Hathaway in the 1970s. He was also well-known statewide as a host on public television.

In 1973, when he was 29, King was diagnosed with an aggressive form of malignant melanoma. King has said he believes he survived cancer only because he had health insurance, and has highlighted this experience when explaining his support for the Affordable Care Act.

In 1975, King returned to Maine to practice with Smith, Loyd and King in Brunswick. In 1983 he was appointed vice president of Swift River/Hafslund Company, which developed alternative energy (hydroelectric and biomass) projects in New England.

In 1989, King founded Northeast Energy Management, Inc., a company that developed and operated electrical energy conservation projects. In 1994 he sold the company. As of 2012 King's investments were valued at between $4.8 million and $22.5 million.

Governor of Maine

Elections

1994 

In May 1993, King announced he would run for governor of Maine as an independent. Incumbent Governor John McKernan, a Republican, was term-limited and could not seek another term. King abandoned his lifelong affiliation with the Maine Democratic Party. "The Democratic Party as an institution has become too much the party that is looking for something from government," King explained to the Bangor Daily News a few weeks after he announced his candidacy.

The Republican nominee was Susan Collins, Commissioner of Professional and Financial Regulation under Governor John McKernan and a protégée of U.S. Senator William Cohen, and at the time relatively unknown to the electorate. The Democratic nominee was former Governor and U.S. Representative Joseph E. Brennan. It was Brennan's fifth campaign for governor.

The general election was a highly competitive four-way race between King, Collins, Brennan, and Green Party nominee Jonathan Carter. King invested early in television advertising during Maine's unusually early June primary, allowing him to emerge from the primary season on an equal footing with his rivals. He positioned himself as a businessman and a pragmatic environmentalist focused on job creation and education. The Washington Times described King as an idealist who "wants to slash regulations but preserve the environment; hold the line on taxes; impose work and education requirements on welfare recipients; experiment with public school choice and cut at least $60 million from the state budget." His opponents criticized him for flip-flopping. Collins argued King "presents different images, depending on who he is talking to. Angus has been a Democrat his whole life. In my opinion, he became an independent because he didn't think he could beat Joe Brennan in a primary. He's extremely smooth, articulate and bright, but he says different things to different groups."

King narrowly won the November 8 election with 35% of the vote to Brennan's 34%, a margin of just 7,878 votes. Collins received 23% of the vote and Carter 6%. King won eight counties, Collins five and Brennan three. King's election as an independent was not unprecedented in Maine politics, as independent James B. Longley had been elected 20 years earlier.

1998 

King won reelection to a second term in 1998 with 59% of the vote, defeating Republican Jim Longley Jr. (the son of the former governor) (19%) and Democrat Thomas Connolly (12%). King's 59% was the highest share of the vote a gubernatorial candidate had received since Brennan's 1982 reelection with 62%. Brennan's 1982 victory was also the last time until 1998 that a gubernatorial candidate had won a majority of the vote, and King's 1998 reelection was the last time a Maine gubernatorial candidate received the majority of the votes cast until 2018.

Tenure

During his tenure, King was the only governor in the United States unaffiliated with any political party. He was also one of only two governors nationwide not affiliated with either of the two major parties, the other being Jesse Ventura of Minnesota, who was elected in 1998 as a member of the Reform Party. The terms of Connecticut's independent governor Lowell Weicker and Alaska's independent governor Walter J. Hickel both ended when King's began. In his book Independent Nation (2004), political analyst John Avlon describes all four governors as radical centrist thinkers.

In 2002 King launched the Maine Learning Technology Initiative (MLTI) to provide laptops for every public middle-school student in the state, the first initiative of its kind in the nation. It met with considerable resistance due to its cost but was enacted by the Maine Legislature. On September 5, 2002, the state began the program with a four-year $37.2-million contract with Apple Inc. to equip all 7th- and 8th-grade students and teachers in the state with laptops.

As governor, King signed legislation requiring that all school employees be fingerprinted and undergo background checks.

Post-gubernatorial career (2003–2013)
The day after he left office in 2003, King, his wife, Mary Herman, and their two children, who were 12 and 9 at the time, embarked on a road trip in a 40-foot motor home to see America. Over the next six months, the family traveled 15,000 miles and visited 33 states before returning home in June 2003.

During his post-gubernatorial residency in Maine, he lectured at Bowdoin College in Brunswick and Bates College in Lewiston. He was appointed a visiting lecturer at Bowdoin in 2004 and an endowed lecturer at Bates in 2009, teaching courses in American politics and political leadership at both institutions.

In 2007 King and Rob Gardiner, formerly of the Maine Public Broadcasting Network, formed Independence Wind, a wind energy company. In August 2009 Independence Wind along with joint venture partner Wagner Forest Management won Maine DEP approval for construction of a proposed $120-million, 22-turbine, utility-scale wind power project along a prominent mountain ridge in Roxbury, Maine. To avoid the appearance of a conflict of interest, King sold his share of the company after entering the 2012 U.S. Senate election. Of the project, King has said, "People who say wind is only an intermittent resource are looking for a one-shot solution. And my experience is that there are rarely silver bullets, but there is often silver buckshot. Wind is an adjunct source of energy. Ten percent, 20% can be very significant".

U.S. Senate

Elections

2012 

On March 5, 2012, King announced that he was running for the U.S. Senate seat being vacated by Olympia Snowe. King said "hogwash" to allegations by some Republicans that he had cut a deal with Democrats to keep U.S. Rep. Chellie Pingree out of the race.

King's Senate campaign came under scrutiny for posting a heavily edited newspaper profile of him on its website.

On November 6, 2012, King won the Senate race with 53% of the vote, beating Democrat Cynthia Dill and Republican Charlie Summers. The following week, King announced that he would caucus with Senate Democrats, explaining not only that it made more sense to affiliate with the party that had a clear majority, but that he would have been largely excluded from the committee process had he not caucused with a party. King said he had not ruled out caucusing with the Republicans if they took control of the Senate in 2014 United States Senate elections, but when Republicans did win the majority that year, he remained in the Democratic caucus. King remained in the Democratic caucus after the 2016, 2018, and the 2020 elections, the first two of which also resulted in Republican Senate majorities and the last of which produced a 50–50 tie.

2018 

On November 6, 2018, King was reelected, defeating Republican Eric Brakey and Democrat Zak Ringelstein.

Tenure
113th Congress (2013–2015)

King supported reform of the Senate filibuster, noting that senators are no longer required to stand on the floor and speak during a filibuster. He also pointed out that the Constitution contains no 60-vote requirement to conduct business in the Senate. Accordingly, in 2013 King voted in favor of the so-called nuclear option to eliminate the filibuster for most presidential nominees.

King opposed attempts by the U.S. House to cut $40 billion from the Supplemental Nutrition Assistance Program over ten years, fearing that it "would affect people in a serious way" and drive more people to soup kitchens and food banks. He supported the more modest Senate efforts to save $4 billion over the same period by closing loopholes.

In 2014 King was chosen for the annual tradition of reading George Washington's Farewell Address to the Senate.

King endorsed his colleague Susan Collins for reelection in the 2014 U.S. Senate election, calling her a "model Senator". At the same time, he endorsed Democratic Senator Jeanne Shaheen of New Hampshire for reelection. King also endorsed Eliot Cutler for governor in the 2014 election, as he had in 2010, but on October 29, 2014, he switched his endorsement to Democratic nominee Mike Michaud. He also endorsed Democrat Emily Cain for the Maine's second congressional district election and Republican Senator Lamar Alexander of Tennessee in his reelection campaign.

After Republicans gained the Senate majority in the 2014 election, King announced that he would continue to caucus with the Democrats. He cited his belief that it is good for a state to have a senator from each party, and that it is important to have a senator who caucuses with the same party as the President, saying, "In the end, who I caucus with is less important than who I work with." He added, "It does not mean I have become a Democrat. It does not mean I have made a promise to anybody."

116th Congress (2019–2021)
In 2020, President Donald Trump said King was "worse than any Democrat" after King had a "testy" exchange with Vice President Mike Pence in a phone call in which King had criticized the executive branch's response to the COVID-19 pandemic in the United States. King stated he had "never been so mad about a phone call in my entire life," after the phone call with Pence. He also called the President and Vice President's response to the pandemic "a dereliction of duty."

117th Congress (2021–2023)
King was participating in the certification of the 2021 United States Electoral College vote count when Trump supporters attacked the United States Capitol. When they breached the Capitol, King and other senators were moved to a safe location. He called the event a "violent insurrection" and "unspeakably sad", and blamed Trump. In the wake of the attack, King announced that he supports invoking the Twenty-fifth Amendment to the United States Constitution to remove Trump from office.

Committee assignments

Current
 Committee on Armed Services
Subcommittee on Airland (2017–present)
Subcommittee on Personnel (2013–2017)
Subcommittee on Seapower
Subcommittee on Strategic Forces (2013–2017; 2019–present) (Chair, 2021–present)
 Committee on Energy and Natural Resources (2015–present)
Subcommittee on Energy
Subcommittee on National Parks (Chair, 2021–present)
Subcommittee on Public Lands, Forests, and Mining (2021–present)
Subcommittee on Water and Power (2015–2021)
 Committee on Rules and Administration
 Select Committee on Intelligence

Previous
 Committee on the Budget (2013–2019)

Caucus memberships
 Afterschool Caucuses

Legislation sponsored
The following is an incomplete list of legislation that King has sponsored:
 Affordable College Textbook Act (S. 1864; 115th Congress)

Political positions
King has been described as a moderate Independent. He has called himself "neither a Democrat nor a Republican, but an American". The nonpartisan National Journal gave him a 2013 composite ideology score of 59% liberal and 41% conservative. His Crowdpac score is −4.3 (10 is the most conservative, −10 the most liberal), based on a data aggregation of his campaign contributions, votes, and speeches. In a study published by The Washington Post called "Party Unity scores," King voted with the Democratic Party 43% of the time. He has also received higher approval ratings from liberal interest groups than conservative ones. King has been rated 89% by the average liberal interest group; the American Conservative Union gave him a 7% lifetime conservative rating in 2020. GovTrack ranks King among the more moderate members of the Senate, near the Senate's ideological center. In 2014, King endorsed his Republican colleague from Maine, Susan Collins. According to FiveThirtyEight, which tracks Congressional votes, King had voted in line with President Trump's position on legislation about 38% of the time as of January 2021.

Agriculture 
In August 2018, King was one of 31 senators to vote against the Protect Interstate Commerce Act of 2018, a proposed amendment to the 2018 United States farm bill that would mandate states to authorize agricultural product sales not prohibited under federal law. After the farm bill passed in December, King and Susan Collins released a statement expressing their delight at the amendment not being included as there were a "number of state laws in Maine that would have been undermined if this amendment was adopted, including those on crate bans for livestock, consumer protections for blueberry inspections, and environmental safeguards for cranberry cultivation".

Economy
King has called for the continuation of a tariff on imported athletic footwear, citing the potential loss of jobs at New Balance's Skowhegan and Madison factories in Maine. Also while governor, King vetoed a bill that would have raised Maine's minimum wage by 25 cents per hour.

In 2017, King opposed the Republican tax bill, criticizing its passage on a party-line vote without hearings, saying: "The Bangor City Council would not amend the leash law using this process." King criticized the legislation for adding $1 trillion to the U.S. budget deficit over ten years and sought to return the bill to committee, but his proposal failed on a party-line vote.

In March 2018, King and fellow Maine senator Susan Collins introduced the Northern Border Regional Commission Reauthorization Act, a bill that would bolster the Northern Border Regional Commission (NBRC) and was included in the 2018 United States farm bill. In June 2019, when King and Collins announced the NBRC would award grant funding to the University of Maine, the senators called the funding an investment in Maine's forest economy that would "help those who have relied on this crucial sector for generations" and "bolster efforts by UMaine to open more opportunities in rural communities."

On April 15, 2020, the Trump administration invited King to join a bipartisan task force on the reopening of the economy amid the ongoing COVID-19 pandemic.

King is supportive of U.S. manufacturers like Auburn Manufacturing, a Maine company that he visited in 2022 to promote domestic manufacturing and speak out against Chinese unfair trade practices.

Foreign relations and national security
King has voted to arm Syrian rebels who are fighting Syrian President Bashar al-Assad and ISIL militants.

King favors the normalization of U.S.–Cuba relations. He opposes the U.S. embargo against Cuba, calling it an "antiquated" relic of the Cold War; in 2015 King introduced legislation to lift the embargo.

As a member of the Senate Intelligence Committee, King participated in its probe of Russia's interference in the 2016 U.S. elections. King said that the entire committee had "no doubt whatsoever" about the Kremlin's culpability in the meddling and described the cyberattacks as "a frontal assault on our democracy" that could present a long-term threat.

In May 2018 King and fellow Maine senator Susan Collins introduced the PRINT Act, a bill that would halt collections of countervailing duties and anti-dumping duties on Canadian newsprint and require the U.S. Department of Commerce to conduct a study of economic health of printing and publishing industries. Proponents of the bill argued it would offer a lifeline to the publishing industry amid newsprint price increases. Critics accused it of setting "a dangerous precedent for future investigations into allegations of unfair trade practices."

In August 2018 King and 16 other lawmakers urged the Trump administration to impose sanctions under the Global Magnitsky Act against Chinese officials responsible for human rights abuses against the Uyghur Muslim minority in western China's Xinjiang region. They wrote: "The detention of as many as a million or more Uyghurs and other predominantly Muslim ethnic minorities in "political reeducation" centers or camps requires a tough, targeted, and global response."

In November 2018 King joined Senators Chris Coons, Marco Rubio and a bipartisan group of lawmakers in sending the Trump administration a letter raising concerns about the People's Republic of China's undue influence on media outlets and academic institutions in the United States. They wrote: "In American news outlets, Beijing has used financial ties to suppress negative information about the CCP. ... Beijing has also sought to use relationships with American academic institutions and student groups to shape public discourse."

In late 2018 King voted to withdraw U.S. military aid for Saudi Arabia's war in Yemen.

In December 2018, after President Trump announced the withdrawal of American troops from Syria, King was one of six senators to sign a letter expressing concern about the move and their belief "that such action at this time is a premature and costly mistake that not only threatens the safety and security of the United States, but also emboldens ISIS, Bashar al Assad, Iran, and Russia."

In October 2019, King was one of six senators to sign a bipartisan letter to Trump calling on him to "urge Turkey to end their offensive and find a way to a peaceful resolution while supporting our Kurdish partners to ensure regional stability" and arguing that to leave Syria without installing protections for American allies would endanger both them and the U.S.

Iran 
In 2015 King supported the Joint Comprehensive Plan of Action, an international agreement with Iran. In voting against a "resolution of disapproval" in opposition to the agreement, King stated, "The current alternatives, if this agreement is rejected, are either unrealistic or downright dangerous."

In May 2019 King said he believed U.S. intel on Iran was accurate but that he wanted to know which country was reacting to the actions of the other, adding that he was "gravely concerned because of the possibility of miscalculation, misunderstanding, misreading of some event and all of the sudden you're on the ladder of escalation that could be dangerous for this country and for the Middle East."

After President Trump halted retaliatory air strikes against Iran after Iran downed an American surveillance drone in June 2019, King said he agreed with the decision not to carry out the strikes but expressed concern about Trump's potentially limited options after steps taken by National Security Advisor John Bolton and Secretary of State Mike Pompeo. King also questioned the difference in U.S. relations with Iran that year as opposed to any other in the country's history and asserted that it was "a high-stakes gamble" if the U.S.'s pressure on Iran was unsuccessful.

Environment and energy
King supports action to combat climate change and carries a laminated graph of increases in carbon dioxide in Earth's atmosphere to respond to climate change denialists. He was the only member of Congress to join a three-day U.S. Coast Guard fact-finding mission to Greenland in 2016, where he witnessed melting ice sheets firsthand and said that the impacts of climate change were "amazing and scary." Nevertheless, in March 2019 King joined Senate Republicans and voted in opposition to the Green New Deal.

King opposes oil drilling in the Arctic National Wildlife Refuge, believing the amount of oil is not worth the environmental risk of extracting it. He also believes that new developments in the energy field, such as fracking, should be subject to "all appropriate environmental safeguards to protect the American people and the American land." King is opposed to the Keystone XL pipeline, stating that the "project will facilitate the transport of some of the world's dirtiest and most climate-harming oil through our country" and has cast several votes against legislation authorizing its construction. He said he was "frustrated" with President Obama's delay in deciding whether to authorize construction, but that he opposed Congress legislating the approval or disapproval of a construction project.

King has expressed opposition to the creation of a Maine Woods National Park, stating on his 2012 campaign website that local control is the best way to conserve land, but in 2014 stating that he was keeping an open mind about the idea.

King initially expressed "serious reservations" about proposals to establish the Katahdin Woods and Waters National Monument, but expressed support for President Obama's creation of the monument in 2016, saying that the administration had made commitments that convinced him that "the benefits of the designation will far outweigh any detriment"; that the monument would not hurt Maine's pulp and paper industry, and that the monument would help diversify the local economy.

King opposes efforts in Maine to ban the baiting and trapping of bears, including an effort to put the question to voters in 2014, calling such practices necessary to prevent interaction between bears and people, and stating the practices are based on science and the views of experts.

In 2017 King and Idaho Senator Jim Risch introduced the Securing Energy Infrastructure Act. The Senate Energy and Natural Resources Committee approved the bill in 2018. The bill creates a pilot program for the federal government to study analog, nondigital and physical systems that can be incorporated into the power grid to mitigate the potential effects of a cyberattack. The idea for the bill came after a 2015 cyberattack in Ukraine took down a large portion of the country's energy grid. In April 2019 King was one of four senators caucusing with the Democrats who voted with Republicans to confirm David Bernhardt, an oil executive, as Secretary of the Interior Department.

In April 2019 King was one of 12 senators to sign a bipartisan letter to top senators on the Appropriations Subcommittee on Energy and Water Development advocating that the Energy Department be granted maximum funding for carbon capture, utilization and storage (CCUS), arguing that American job growth could be stimulated by investment in capturing carbon emissions and expressing disagreement with President Trump's 2020 budget request to combine the two federal programs that do carbon capture research.

In July 2019 King called climate change "one of the most serious threats to" the United States, saying that two thirds of Arctic ice has disappeared over the past 30 years. A release from King's office stated that he had asserted the vital need for the U.S. to return to the aspirations of the Paris Climate Accord.

Immigration
King strongly criticized President Donald Trump's Executive Order 13769, which barred the admission of refugees to the U.S. and barred travel by nationals of several Muslim-majority countries to the country. King stated: "This is probably the worst foreign policy decision since the invasion of Iraq. What it's done is played right into ISIS's hands. They want us to turn this into a war of the west against Islam. They have explicitly said they want to drive a wedge ... There are 1.6 billion Muslims in the world and we don't want a war with all of them. We don't need a war with all of them. We're not opposed to all of them." King noted that U.S. forces fought alongside Muslim Iraqi troops, and that much valuable counterterrorism intelligence was shared with the U.S. by Muslim nations.

In 2018 King introduced legislation to halt separations of immigrant families at the border.

In June 2019, King and fellow Maine senator Susan Collins released a joint statement confirming that they had questioned U.S. Customs and Border Protection "on the process being used to clear" asylum seekers for transportation to Portland, Maine, and opined that it was "clearly not a sustainable approach to handling the asylum situation." Collins and King were said to both be "interested in providing additional resources to the federal agencies that process asylum claims, so we can reduce the existing backlog and adjudicate new claims in a more timely fashion."

Gun laws
King supports expanding background checks to most firearms transactions, with exceptions for transfers between family members, calling such a position "the single most effective step" that can be taken to keep guns out of the wrong hands. He supports limiting the size of magazines to 10 rounds, and to make purchasing a gun for someone not legally allowed to have one a federal crime. He does not support a ban on assault weapons, believing it will not work and that such a ban is not based on the functionality of the weapons, which are not relevantly different from the many hunting rifles owned by Maine residents. He noted that the vast majority of gun crimes are committed with handguns, not rifles.

King voted for the Manchin–Toomey amendment to expand background checks for gun purchases.

In 2018 King was a cosponsor of the NICS Denial Notification Act, legislation developed in the aftermath of the Stoneman Douglas High School shooting that would require federal authorities to inform states within a day after a person failing the National Instant Criminal Background Check System attempted to buy a firearm.

In August 2019, following two mass shootings in El Paso and Dayton, King cosponsored the Extreme Risk Protection Order Act, a bill authorizing states to use grants to develop red flag laws which would allow family members to petition courts for an order that would temporarily prevent someone from purchasing a gun and an order for law enforcement to take a firearm away.

Health issues
King supports the Patient Protection and Affordable Care Act (ACA or Obamacare), but has expressed support for modest adjustments to the legislation if they can be done on a bipartisan basis. In 2013 he voted to restore funding for the ACA as part of an amendment to legislation that funded government operations for 45 days. He has said that those opposed to the ACA who are attempting to discourage people from purchasing health insurance are "guilty of murder" and that doing so was "one of the grossest violations of our humanity that I could think of." In making this comment, King noted a time in his life when he believed he would have died had he not just acquired health insurance.

In 2015, as part of the Obama administration's fiscal year 2016 budget, the United States Department of Veteran Affairs proposed congressional authorization for $6.8 million toward leasing 56,600 square feet at an unspecified location in Portland, Maine, to expand a clinic that would authorize southern Maine veterans to receive basic medical and mental health care locally. King supported the proposal. He and Susan Collins released a statement that ensuring Maine veterans had access to high quality care "is one of our top priorities, and we're pursuing the input of local veterans and interested stakeholders to understand their perspective about the proposal."

In January 2017 King voted against the Republican Senate budget plan to accelerate repeal of the ACA and block repeal legislation from being filibustered; the measure passed on a largely party line 51–48 vote. He spoke out against the House Republican repeal legislation, noting that the Congressional Budget Office estimated that 14 million Americans would lose health insurance if the legislation were enacted. Of the House Republican bill, King said, "If you were designing a bill to hammer my state, it would be this bill," adding that it would most adversely affect Maine residents between the ages of 50 and 65.

King is a supporter of the Children's Health Insurance Program (CHIP) program.

King favors abortion rights.

In February 2017 King and 30 other senators signed a letter to Kaléo Pharmaceuticals in response to an increase of the opioid-overdose-reversing device Evzio's price from $690 in 2014 to $4,500. They requested the detailed price structure for Evzio, the number of devices Kaléo Pharmaceuticals set aside for donation, and the totality of federal reimbursements Evzio received in the previous year.

King criticized Trump's 2017 budget proposal for its cuts to medical research. In 2018 he voted with all Republicans except Rand Paul and six Democrats to confirm Alex Azar, Trump's nominee for Health Secretary.

In June 2018 King and fellow Maine Senator Susan Collins released a statement endorsing a proposal by FCC Chairman Ajit Pai intended to boost funding for the Rural Health Care Program of the Universal Service Fund, writing that "with demand for RHC funding continuing to rise, any further inaction would risk leaving rural healthcare practitioners without lifesaving telemedicine services. This long-overdue funding increase would be a boon to both healthcare providers and patients in rural communities across our country."

In July 2019 King was one of eight senators to cosponsor the Palliative Care and Hospice Education and Training Act (PCHETA), a bill intended to strengthen training for new and existing physicians, people who teach palliative care, and other providers who are on palliative care teams that grant patients and their families a voice in their care and treatment goals.

In October 2019 King was one of 27 senators to sign a letter to Senate Majority Leader Mitch McConnell and Senate Minority Leader Chuck Schumer advocating the passage of the Community Health Investment, Modernization, and Excellence (CHIME) Act, which was set to expire the following month. The senators warned that if the funding for the Community Health Center Fund (CHCF) was allowed to expire, it "would cause an estimated 2,400 site closures, 47,000 lost jobs, and threaten the health care of approximately 9 million Americans."

King has voted against Republican attempts to completely defund Planned Parenthood, calling the proposals an "unfounded yet relentless assault" and "another example of misguided outrage that would only hurt those who need help the most." No federal funds go to Planned Parenthood for abortions (federal dollars pay for other health care services provided by the group, such as contraception and screenings for cancer and sexually transmitted diseases), but Republicans have sought to completely defund the organization because it provides abortions with other funds. King stated that supporters of the bill were in effect voting to deprive low-income Americans of healthcare over an issue "that has nothing to do with the 97 percent of the services that Planned Parenthood provides," saying: "To me, this bill is like attacking Brazil after Pearl Harbor."

Minimum wage
On March 5, 2021, King voted against Bernie Sanders's amendment to include a $15/hour minimum wage in the American Rescue Plan Act of 2021.

Railroad safety 
In June 2019 King was one of ten senators to cosponsor the Safe Freight Act, a bill that would require freight trains have one or more certified conductors and a certified engineer aboard who can collaborate on how to protect both the train and people living near the tracks. The legislation was meant to correct a Federal Railroad Administration rollback of a proposed rule intended to establish safety standards.

Same-sex marriage
King supports same-sex marriage. He signed an amicus brief to the U.S. Supreme Court in United States v. Windsor encouraging it to strike down the Defense of Marriage Act.

United States Postal Service 
In March 2019 King was a cosponsor of a bipartisan resolution led by Gary Peters and Jerry Moran that opposed privatization of the United States Postal Service (USPS), citing the USPS as a self-sustained establishment and noting concerns that privatization could cause higher prices and reduced services for its customers, especially in rural communities.

Telecommunications 
In April 2019 King was one of seven senators to sponsor the Digital Equity Act of 2019, legislation establishing a $120 million grant program that would fund both the creation and implementation of "comprehensive digital equity plans" in each U.S. state to support projects developed by individuals and groups. The bill also gave the National Telecommunications and Information Administration (NTIA) the role of evaluating and providing guidance for digital equity projects.

Trade 
In February 2019, during ongoing trade disputes between the United States and China, King was one of ten senators to sign a bipartisan letter to Homeland Security Secretary Kirstjen Nielsen and Energy Secretary Rick Perry asserting that the American government "should consider a ban on the use of Huawei inverters in the United States and work with state and local regulators to raise awareness and mitigate potential threats" and urging them "to work with all federal, state and local regulators, as well as the hundreds of independent power producers and electricity distributors nationwide to ensure our systems are protected."

Electoral history

Personal life
King's first wife was Edie Birney. She is the mother of King's three older sons. King and Birney divorced in 1982.

In 1984, King married Mary Herman, his current wife. King has five children and six grandchildren.

King is an Episcopalian. He rides a Harley-Davidson motorcycle.

As of 2018 King's net worth, according to OpenSecrets.org, was more than $9.4 million.

Health issues
In June 2015, King underwent a successful surgery that removed a cancerous prostate that had been detected in a screening and biopsy. The surgery did not change King's plans to run for reelection in 2018.

On August 19, 2021, King and fellow senators Roger Wicker and John Hickenlooper tested positive for COVID-19. He fully recovered from the disease, saying, "I didn't feel great during the worst of my illness, but I'm confident that I would have felt a whole lot worse if I hadn't received the vaccine".

Honors and awards

Scholastic

 University degrees

 Chancellor, visitor, governor, rector and fellowships

Honorary degrees
Honorary degrees

Memberships and fellowships

References

External links

Senator Angus King official U.S. Senate website
 Campaign website
 

|-

|-

|-

1944 births
21st-century American politicians
American Episcopalians
American television hosts
Bates College faculty
Bowdoin College faculty
Businesspeople from Maine
Dartmouth College alumni
Democratic Party governors of Maine
Democratic Party United States senators from Maine
Governors of Maine
Independent state governors of the United States
Independent United States senators
Living people
Maine lawyers
People associated with renewable energy
Politicians from Alexandria, Virginia
Politicians from Brunswick, Maine
Radical centrist writers
Maine Independents
United States congressional aides
University of Virginia School of Law alumni
Writers from Brunswick, Maine
American gun control activists